Loikan is a village in Kyaukme Township, Shan State, Burma.

History
In the 1900s, the nearby Valley of Death was a frequent battleground for the Kaung Kha rebel militia, who fought against various government forces.

In the 2010s, the village became a ketamine and methamphetamine haven for Asian drug cartel Sam Gor, and a drug compound near the village was raided in 2018. In 2020, Myanmar police discovered over 3,700 litres of methylfentanyl in Loikan.

References

Populated places in Shan State